is a mail notification system for Unix.

Usage 
When a new mail message is delivered, the program  alerts the recipient so they can read it immediately. The alert is sent to the tty where the recipient is logged in, and contains the Subject, From line, and first few lines of the body of the new message. The alert also includes terminal beeps to guarantee quick attention.

Notification is enabled by the command

and disabled by

Comsat 
The biff utility was the user interface used to change notification preferences. The actual act of notifying the user was performed by a daemon called  (short for "communications satellite"). The  daemon received messages via UDP describing the update to the mailbox, and would then inform the user of the new message.

Replacements 
Because the sudden, unexpected printing of a block of text on a tty can be annoying if it overwrites more useful information on the screen that can't be easily regenerated,  is not used very much any more. Some modern MTAs do not even support comsat (the server process which listens for reports of incoming mail) making  useless.

The general idea of the incoming mail alert has remained very popular even as the original biff and comsat have been almost completely abandoned. The concept also extends outside the Unix world — the AOL "You've got mail" voice could be seen as a talking biff.

Variant 
This makes  less disruptive.

Origin and name 
 was written by John Foderero for 4.0BSD. It was named after a dog belonging to Heidi Stettner, another Berkeley CS student; the dog was well known to many students as he would accompany Stettner around campus.
 
Eric Cooper, a student contemporary to Foderero and Stettner, reports that the dog would bark at the mail carrier, making it a natural choice for the name of a mail notification system. Stettner herself contradicts this.

References 

Unix software
Email